Deudorix kayonza, the false coffee playboy, is a butterfly in the family Lycaenidae. It is found in Sierra Leone, Ivory Coast, Ghana, Cameroon, the Republic of the Congo, the Central African Republic, the eastern part of the Democratic Republic of the Congo, western Uganda and Zambia. The habitat consists of forests.

Adults feed from the flowers of Eupatorium odorata.

References

Butterflies described in 1956
Deudorigini
Deudorix